KHRT may refer to:

 KHRT (AM), a radio station (1320 AM) licensed to Minot, North Dakota, United States
 KHRT-FM, a radio station (106.9 FM) licensed to Minot, North Dakota, United States
 The ICAO code for Hurlburt Field, an airbase in Mary Esther, Florida, United States